Tennessine (117Ts) is the most-recently synthesized synthetic element, and much of the data is hypothetical. As for any synthetic element, a standard atomic weight cannot be given. Like all synthetic elements, it has no stable isotopes. The first (and so far only) isotopes to be synthesized were 293Ts and 294Ts in 2009. The longer-lived isotope is 294Ts with a half-life of 51 ms.

List of isotopes 

|-
| 293Ts
| style="text-align:right" | 117
| style="text-align:right" | 176
| 293.20824(89)#
| 22 (+8−4) ms
| α
| 289Mc
|
|-
| 294Ts
| style="text-align:right" | 117
| style="text-align:right" | 177
| 294.21046(74)#
| 51 (+41−16) ms
| α
| 290Mc
|

Isotopes and nuclear properties

Nucleosynthesis

Target-projectile combinations leading to Z=117 compound nuclei
The below table contains various combinations of targets and projectiles that could be used to form compound nuclei with atomic number 117.

Hot fusion

249Bk (48Ca, xn)297−xTs (x=3,4)
Between July 2009 and February 2010, the team at the JINR (Flerov Laboratory of Nuclear Reactions) ran a 7-month-long experiment to synthesize tennessine using the reaction above.
The expected cross-section was of the order of 2 pb. The expected evaporation residues, 293Ts and 294Ts, were predicted to decay via relatively long decay chains as far as isotopes of dubnium or lawrencium.

The team published a paper in April 2010 (first results were presented in January 2010) that six atoms of the isotopes 294Ts (one atom) and 293Ts (five atoms) were detected. 294Ts decayed by six alpha decays down as far as the new isotope 270Db, which underwent apparent spontaneous fission. The lighter odd-even isotope underwent just three alpha decays, as far as 281Rg, which underwent spontaneous fission. The reaction was run at two different excitation energies, 35 MeV (dose 2×1019) and 39 MeV (dose 2.4×1019). Initial decay data was published as a preliminary presentation on the JINR website.

A further experiment in May 2010, aimed at studying the chemistry of the granddaughter of tennessine, nihonium, identified a further two atoms of 286Nh from decay of 294Ts. The original experiment was repeated successfully by the same collaboration in 2012 and by a joint German–American team in May 2014, confirming the discovery.

Chronology of isotope discovery

Theoretical calculations

Evaporation residue cross sections
The below table contains various targets-projectile combinations for which calculations have provided estimates for cross section yields from various neutron evaporation channels. The channel with the highest expected yield is given.

DNS = Di-nuclear system; σ = cross section

Decay characteristics
Theoretical calculations in a quantum tunneling model with mass estimates from a macroscopic-microscopic model predict the alpha-decay half-lives of isotopes of tennessine (namely, 289–303Ts) to be around 0.1–40 ms.

References

External sources 
 Isotope masses from:
 
 
 Isotopic compositions and standard atomic masses from:

 
Tennessine
Tennessine